Kotri Muhammad Kabir is a Union Council of Taluka Mehrabpur, Naushahro Feroze District, Sindh, Pakistan. It is situated along National Highway (N5). The tomb of the saint Mohammad kabir and his son’ tombShakhi Allahyar is a feature of the town.

Images

References

Populated places in Naushahro Feroze District